The Rio de Janeiro motorcycle Grand Prix was a motorcycling event that was part of the Grand Prix motorcycle racing season from 1995 to 2004.

Official names and sponsors
1995, 1997: Lucky Strike Rio Grand Prix
1996: GP Rio (no official sponsor)
1999: Telefônica Celular Rio Grand Prix
2000–2004: Cinzano Rio Grand Prix

Winners of the Rio de Janeiro motorcycle Grand Prix

Multiple winners (riders)

Multiple winners (manufacturers)

By year

References

 

 
Recurring sporting events established in 1995
Recurring sporting events disestablished in 2004
1995 establishments in Brazil
2004 disestablishments in Brazil